The Bayernliga is the highest football league in Bavaria. It can be translated as Bavarian league. Bayernliga may also refer to:

Football
Bayernliga: The fifth tier of the German football league system
Under 19 Fußball-Bayernliga: A youth football league in Bavaria for under 19 year olds
Under 17 Fußball-Bayernliga: A youth football league in Bavaria for under 17 year olds
Under 15 Fußball-Bayernliga: A youth football league in Bavaria for under 15 year olds

Ice hockey
Bayernliga: Highest ice hockey league in Bavaria